Ernest Friderich (23 October 1886 Paris – 22 January 1954 Nice) was a French racecar driver.

Indy 500 results

1886 births
1954 deaths
French racing drivers
Indianapolis 500 drivers